Husayn Quli is a Turkic-derived Muslim male given name meaning 'slave of Husayn'.  It is built from quli. It is equivalent to Arabic-derived Abd al-Husayn or Persian-derived Gholamhoseyn.

People
 Huseyngulu Sarabski
 Hosayn Qoli Donboli
 Husain Quli Beg

See also
 Hoseyn Qoli (disambiguation)